The Täles Railway may refer to one of two railway lines in Baden-Württemberg, Germany

 Täles Railway (Nürtingen–Neuffen)
 Täles Railway (Geislingen–Wiesensteig)